is a subway station on the Sapporo Municipal Subway Tōhō Line in Toyohira-ku, Sapporo, Hokkaido, Japan. It is numbered "H10".

Platforms

History
The station opened on 14 October 1994.

Surrounding area
 National Route 453, (to Date)
 National Route 453, (to Muroran)
 Toyohira Police Station
 Toyohira Bridge Post Office
 Sapporo Sewerage Bureau
 Hokkai Gakuen University
 Hokkai School of Commerce
 Sapporo International Youth Hostel

External links

 Sapporo Subway Stations
 

Railway stations in Sapporo
Sapporo Municipal Subway
Toyohira-ku, Sapporo
Railway stations in Japan opened in 1994